Two-time defending champion Martina Navratilova successfully defended her title, defeating Helena Suková in the final, 6–3, 7–5, 6–4 to win the singles tennis title at the 1985 Virginia Slims Championships. It was her sixth Tour Finals singles title.

Seeds

  Martina Navratilova (champion)
  Chris Evert-Lloyd (first round)
  Hana Mandlíková (semifinals)
  Helena Suková (final)

Draw

See also
WTA Tour Championships appearances

References
 1985 Virginia Slims Championships Draw

Singles 1985
Singles